Duplodnaviria is a realm of viruses that includes all double-stranded DNA viruses that encode the HK97 fold major capsid protein. The HK97 fold major capsid protein (HK97 MCP) is the primary component of the viral capsid, which stores the viral deoxyribonucleic acid (DNA). Viruses in the realm also share a number of other characteristics, such as an icosahedral capsid, an opening in the viral capsid called a portal, a protease enzyme that empties the inside of the capsid prior to DNA packaging, and a terminase enzyme that packages viral DNA into the capsid.

Duplodnaviria was established in 2019 based on the shared characteristics of viruses in the realm. There are two groups of viruses in Duplodnaviria: tailed bacteriophages of the order Caudovirales, which infect prokaryotes, and herpesviruses of the order Herpesvirales, which infect animals. Tailed bacteriophages are very diverse and ubiquitous worldwide, and they may be the oldest lineage of viruses. Herpesviruses either share a common ancestor with tailed bacteriophages or are a breakaway group from within Caudovirales.

Tailed bacteriophages are important in marine ecology by recycling nutrients in organic material from their hosts and are the focus of much research, and herpesviruses are associated with a variety of diseases in animals, including humans. A common feature among viruses in Duplodnaviria is that many are able to persist in their host for long periods of time without replicating while still being able to resurface in the future. Examples of this include the herpes simplex virus, which causes recurring infections, and the varicella zoster virus, which initially causes chickenpox early in life then shingles later in life.

Etymology
The name Duplodnaviria is a portmanteau of duplo, the Latin word for double, dna, from deoxyribonucleic acid (DNA), referencing that all members of the realm at founding had double-stranded DNA genomes, and -viria, which is the suffix used for virus realms. Duplodnaviria is monotypic, having only one kingdom, Heunggongvirae, so both the realm and kingdom have the same definition. Heunggongvirae takes the first part of its name from Cantonese 香港 [Hēunggóng], meaning and approximately pronounced "Hong Kong", which is a reference to Escherichia virus HK97, the founding member of the HK97 (Hong Kong 97) fold MCP viruses, and the suffix -virae, which is the suffix used for virus kingdoms.

Characteristics
All viruses in Duplodnaviria contain a distinct icosahedral capsid that is composed of a major capsid protein that contains a unique folded structure, called the HK97 fold, named after the folded structure of the MCP of the bacteriophage species Escherichia virus HK97. Despite having significant variation across Duplodnaviria, the base structure of the protein is retained among all species in the realm. Other shared proteins that involve the structure and assembly of capsids include a portal protein that the opening of the capsid is made of, a protease that empties the capsid before DNA is inserted, and the terminase enzyme that inserts the DNA into the capsid.

After HK97 MCPs have been synthesized by the host cell's ribosomes, the viral capsid is assembled from them with the proteins bonding to each other. The inside of the capsid contains scaffold proteins that guide the geometric construction of the capsid. In the absence of separate scaffolding proteins, the delta domain of HK97 MCP, which faces toward the inside of the capsid, acts as a scaffold protein.

A cylindrical opening in the capsid, called a portal, that serves as the entrance and exit for viral DNA is created with portal proteins at one of the 12 vertices of the capsid. The scaffold protein, which may be the delta domain of HK97 MCP, is removed from the inside of the capsid by the capsid maturation protease, which may also be a part of the scaffolding, breaking it and itself down to smaller molecules in a process called proteolysis that leaves the inside of the capsid empty.

At the same time as capsid assembly, replication of the viral DNA occurs, creating concatemers, long molecules of DNA containing numerous copies of the viral genome. The enzyme terminase, made of two subunits, large and small, finds the viral DNA inside of the cell via the small subunit, cuts the concatemers, and creates the termini, or endings, of the genomes. Terminase recognizes a packaging signal in the genome and cuts the nucleic acid, creating a free end that it binds to.

The terminase, now bound to the concatemer, attaches itself to the capsid portal and begins translocating the DNA from outside the capsid to the inside, using energy generated from ATP hydrolysis by the large subunit. As more DNA is inserted into the capsid, the capsid expands in size, becomes thinner, and its surface becomes flatter and more angular. Once the genome is completely inside, terminase cuts the concatemer again, completing packaging. Terminase then detaches itself from the portal and proceeds to repeat this process until all genomes in the concatemer have been packaged.

For tailed bacteriophages, after DNA packaging, the tail of the virion, which was assembled separately, is attached to the capsid, commonly called the "head" of tailed bacteriophages, at the portal. Tailed bacteriophages also sometimes have "decoration" proteins that attach to the capsid's surface in order to reinforce the capsid's structure. After the virion is fully assembled inside the host cell, it leaves the cell. Tailed bacteriophages leave the cell via lysis, rupturing of the cell membrane, that causes cell death, and herpesviruses leave by budding from the host cell membrane, using the membrane as a viral envelope that covers the capsid.

Phylogenetics
Tailed bacteriophages are potentially the oldest lineage of viruses in the world because they are ubiquitous worldwide, only infect prokaryotes, and have a high level of diversity. Their highly divergent virion structures may point to this or may indicate separate origins. The origin of Herpesvirales is unclear, but there are two likely scenarios. First, ancestral lineages of Caudoviricetes may have produced clades at various times that were capable of infecting eukaryotes, and the strong similarity that Herpesvirales has with Caudoviricetes may indicate that it is a more recent descendant of one such lineage. The second likely scenario is that Herpesvirales is a breakaway clade from within Caudoviricetes, which is supported by one of the Caudoviricetes subfamilies, Tevenvirinae, showing a relatively high genetic relation to herpesviruses based on certain protein amino acid sequences. It has been suggested that Duplodnaviria predates the last universal common ancestor (LUCA) of cellular life and that viruses in the realm were present in the LUCA.

The HK97 fold MCP appears to have been created from a DUF1884 protein family domain that was inserted into a strand-helix-strand-strand (SHS2) fold protein related to the dodecin protein family. The resulting protein was then acquired by a mobile genetic element, leading to the creation of duplodnaviruses. Outside of Duplodnaviria, an HK97-like fold is only found in encapsulins, a type of prokaryotic nanocompartment that encapsulate a variety of cargo proteins related to the oxidative stress response. Encapsulins assemble into icosahedrons like the capsids of duplodnaviruses, but the HK97 MCP in viruses is much more divergent and widespread than in encapsulins, which form a narrow monophyletic clade. As such, it is more likely that encapsulins are derived from viruses than vice versa. Archaea of the phylum Thermoproteota (formerly Crenarchaeota) contain encapsulins but are not known to be infected by tailed bacteriophages though, so the relation between encapsulins and Duplodnaviria remains unresolved.

The ATPase subunit of Duplodnaviria terminases that generates energy for packaging viral DNA has the same general structural design of the P-loop fold as the packaging ATPases of double jelly roll fold MCP viruses in the realm Varidnaviria but are otherwise not directly related to each other. While viruses in Duplodnaviria make use of the HK97 fold for their major capsid proteins, the major capsid proteins of viruses in Varidnaviria instead are marked by single or double vertical jelly roll folds.

Classification
Duplodnaviria contains only one kingdom, and this kingdom is subdivided into two phyla. This taxonomy can be visualized as follows:

 Realm: Duplodnaviria
 Kingdom: Heunggongvirae
 Phylum: Peploviricota
 Class: Herviviricetes
 Order: Herpesvirales – the herpesviruses, which infect animals (eukaryotes)
 Phylum: Uroviricota
 Class: Caudoviricetes – the tailed bacteriophages, which infect archaea and bacteria (prokaryotes)

As all viruses in the realm are double-stranded DNA (dsDNA) viruses, the realm belongs to Group I: dsDNA viruses of Baltimore classification, a classification system based on a virus's manner of messenger RNA (mRNA) production, often used alongside standard virus taxonomy, which is based on evolutionary history. Realms are the highest level of taxonomy used for viruses and Duplodnaviria is one of six, the other five being Adnaviria,Monodnaviria, Riboviria, Ribozyviria and Varidnaviria.

Interactions with hosts

Viral shunt
Tailed bacteriophages are ubiquitous worldwide and are a major cause of death among prokaryotes. Infection may lead to cell death via lysis, the rupturing of the cell membrane. As a result of lysis, organic material from the killed prokaryotes is released into the environment, contributing to a process called viral shunt. Tailed bacteriophages shunt nutrients from organic material away from higher trophic levels so that they can be consumed by organisms in lower trophic levels, which has the effects of recycling nutrients and promoting increased diversity among marine life.

Disease
Herpesviruses are associated with a wide range of diseases in their hosts, including a respiratory tract illness in chickens, a respiratory and reproductive illness in cattle, and tumors in sea turtles. In humans, herpesviruses usually cause various epithelial diseases such as herpes simplex, chickenpox and shingles, and Kaposi's sarcoma. Initial infection causes acute symptoms and leads to lifelong infection via latency. Herpesviruses may emerge from their latency to cause illnesses, which may have severe symptoms such as encephalitis and pneumonia.

Latency

Viruses in Duplodnaviria have two different types of replication cycles, called the lytic cycle, whereby infection leads directly to virion formation and exit from the host cell, and the lysogenic cycle, whereby a latent infection retains the viral DNA inside of the host cell without virion formation, either as an episome or via integration into the host cell's DNA, with the possibility of returning to the lytic cycle in the future. Viruses that can replicate through the lysogenic cycle are called temperate or lysogenic viruses. Tailed bacteriophages vary in their temperateness, whereas all herpesviruses are temperate and able to avoid detection by the host's immune system, causing lifelong infections.

History
Tailed bacteriophages were discovered independently by Frederick Twort in 1915 and Félix d'Hérelle in 1917, and they have been the focus of much research since then. Diseases in humans caused by herpesviruses have been recognized for much of recorded history, and person-to-person transmission of the herpes simplex virus, the first herpesvirus discovered, was first recognized in 1893 by Émile Vidal.

Over time, the two groups were increasingly found to share many characteristics, and their genetic relation was formalized with the establishment of Duplodnaviria in 2019. The creation of the kingdom, phyla, and classes of the realm in the same year has also created a framework to more easily allow major reorganization of Caudovirales, which is growing in size significantly and which may require tailed bacteriophages to be promoted to the rank of class or higher.

See also

 List of higher virus taxa

References

Further reading
 

Viruses
Virus realms